The 1969–70 Cypriot Cup was the 28th edition of the Cypriot Cup. A total of 16 clubs entered the competition. It began on 4 April 1970 with the first round and concluded on 3 May 1970 with the final which was held at GSP Stadium (1902). Pezoporikos Larnaca won their 1st Cypriot Cup trophy after beating ]Alki Larnaca 2–1 in the final.

Sources

See also
 Cypriot Cup
 1969–70 Cypriot First Division

Cypriot Cup seasons
1969–70 domestic association football cups
1969–70 in Cypriot football